Claire Alanson Frye (May 10, 1899 – October 16, 1971) was a college football player.

College football
Frye played football for many years. In 1917 and 1918 he was All A. E. F. center in France. He scrubbed at Tech a year and won letters in 1921, 1922, and 1923. Frye was selected All-Southern in 1922 and 1923. In 1922 he received more votes at the center position than the likes of Clyde Propst and Ed Kubale.

He and two other men were once accused of severely assaulting a man, then forcing him to kneel in apology before a well-known society girl for an alleged insult.

References

American football centers
Georgia Tech Yellow Jackets football players
All-Southern college football players
1899 births
1971 deaths
Sportspeople from Oklahoma City